Prize Fight is a boxing promotional company in the southern United States.

Prize Fight Boxing was created by brothers Brian and Russell Young. 

Prize Fight  has promoted fights such as: Lennox Lewis vs. Mike Tyson 2002, Roy Jones Jr. vs. Glen Johnson 2004, Antonio Tarver vs. Glen Johnson 2005, The 2004 United States Olympic Boxing Trials, and Jermain Taylor vs. Winky Wright.

References

External links
 Official web site

Boxing